Allied Schools is a for-profit post-secondary educational services company founded in 1992.  The company markets its certificate courses to working professionals, stay-at-home parents, military service members and disabled individuals to obtain training and credentials for career advancement, professional development or personal growth through distance education.

History 
Allied Schools began in 1979 through Ashley Crown Systems, Inc., a publishing company providing services for education vendors. In 1992, Allied Schools developed vocational training courses through distance learning platforms starting in the real estate industry. By January 1996, Allied Schools launched a fully integrated online school website, complete with an in-house developed student learning platform.

Online Courses

Real Estate 

 Real Estate Licensing
 Real Estate Broker Licensing 
 Real Estate Appraisal Licensing 
 7-hr National USPAP 
 15-hr National USPAP 
 Real Estate Salesperson Renewal/Continuing Education
 Real Estate Broker Renewal
 Online Notary Public Course
 Real Estate Appraisal Renewal 
 SAFE Mortgage Loan Originator Licensing
 SAFE Continuing Education
 Property Management
 Home Inspection
 California Contractor's Licensing

See also 
 List of colleges and universities in California

Citations

References 

BUSINESS IN THE SPOTLIGHT: Allied Schools is a private distance-learning school.   OC Register, November 6, 2007

Distance education institutions based in the United States
Universities and colleges in Orange County, California
Education companies of the United States
Educational institutions established in 1992
For-profit universities and colleges in the United States
1992 establishments in California
American companies established in 1992
Private universities and colleges in California